Consolidated Communications of Northern New England Company, LLC is a Bell Operating Company founded in 2006. It is a subsidiary of Consolidated Communications and operates telephone lines in Maine, New Hampshire, and Western Massachusetts originally served by New England Telephone.

History
Northern New England Telephone Operations was created as a subsidiary of Verizon New England named Northern New England Telephone Operations, Inc. to operate exchanges that Verizon was preparing to sell to FairPoint Communications in Maine, New Hampshire, and Vermont.

Sale to FairPoint
In 2008, the company was spun off from Verizon and merged into FairPoint, with all Northern New England Spinco subsidiaries becoming direct holdings of FairPoint. One of the conditions of the sale, despite protest by FairPoint, was that NNETO would be regulated as a Bell Operating Company. The biggest element of this condition required FairPoint to follow rules applying to the Baby Bells under the Second Computer Inquiry decision in their newly acquired territories in Maine, New Hampshire, and Vermont.

Following the sale, Northern New England Telephone Operations was converted to a limited liability company. The company's operations in Vermont were separated into Telephone Operating Company of Vermont, which is wholly owned by NNETO.

NNETO is separate from Northern Telephone Company of Maine, a FairPoint subsidiary which consists of some former Contel lines sold off by GTE in 1994.

Effective January 28, 2019, the company was renamed Consolidated Communications of Northern New England Company, LLC following the purchase of FairPoint by Consolidated Communications.

See also
Verizon New England
Consolidated Communications of Vermont

References

Verizon Communications
FairPoint Communications
Bell System
American companies established in 2007
Communications in Maine
Communications in New Hampshire